Mount Defiance is an  high hill on the New York side of Lake Champlain, in the northeastern United States. It is notable in that the hill militarily dominates both Fort Ticonderoga and Mount Independence, but it was deemed inaccessible so never fortified. Mount Defiance was previously known as Sugar Loaf.

In the 1777 Siege of Fort Ticonderoga, the British army succeeded in positioning artillery on Mount Defiance, causing the Americans to withdraw from both forts without a fight.

Mount Defiance is located in the town of Ticonderoga in southeastern Essex County.

Gallery

References

External links
 Fort Ticonderoga National Historic Landmark - Battlegrounds (includes Mount Defiance)

Mountains of Essex County, New York
Mountains of New York (state)